Thorncliffe Recreation F.C. was an English association football club based in Sheffield, South Yorkshire.

History

League and cup history

Honours

League
Sheffield Association League
Champions: 1952–53, 1959–60

Cup
Wharncliffe Charity Cup
Winners: 1953–54, 1959–60

Records
Best FA Amateur Cup performance: 3rd Qualifying Round, 1956–57, 1961–62

References

Defunct football clubs in England
Defunct football clubs in South Yorkshire
Hatchard League
Sheffield Association League